Equinox Digital Music Distribution (DMD) is a company distributing Indonesian music on iTunes. As most Indonesian CDs are not distributed outside Indonesia, its iTunes recordings are one of the few means of obtaining popular Indonesian music outside of Indonesia, Malaysia and Singapore.

Overview 
Equinox DMD, a subsidiary of Equinox Publishing, was founded in February 2006 to distribute music from Indonesia to the iTunes Store. As of March 2007, Equinox DMD represents over 200 bands with 300 albums. The main promotion comes in the form of a podcast entitled "New Music from Indonesia" and is sponsored by PT Djarum of Indonesia.

References

Retail companies of Indonesia